The Rest is Politics is a British podcast hosted by Alastair Campbell and Rory Stewart. It launched in March 2022, and has since been one of the leading political podcasts in the United Kingdom. The podcast is produced by Goalhanger Podcasts. Campbell and Stewart generally discuss contemporary news and politics.

Background
Both Alastair Campbell and Rory Stewart are former political figures, and both have been expelled from their respective parties for their opposition to more extreme elements in them. Their podcast is aimed at "disagreeing agreeably", seeking a more temperate and informed political debate.

Campbell is a journalist, political strategist, and mental health activist, known for his work as communications chief for Tony Blair. A former member of the Labour Party, Campbell was expelled after having voted for the Liberal Democrats in the 2019 European elections.

Stewart is a diplomat, author, soldier, and politician. He served as Conservative international development secretary and prisons minister under Theresa May. He represented Penrith and The Border in the House of Commons for around nine years. In 2019, after Boris Johnson was elected leader of the Conservatives, Stewart resigned from the cabinet. Subsequently, having rebelled against Johnson's approach to Brexit, he was  expelled from the parliamentary party. He later resigned his party membership as well.

Goalhanger is owned by former England footballer Gary Lineker, and also produces the podcast The Rest is History, hosted by Dominic Sandbrook and Tom Holland.

Format
The podcast ordinarily releases two episodes every week: a "main" episode and a "question time" episode. The main episodes last around 30 to 50 minutes, and involve Campbell and Stewart discussing contemporary events and news stories, mostly from the United Kingdom. During the question time episodes, they answer questions from listeners. The questions are not limited to topics formerly discussed on the podcast, and include news stories not discussed on the main episodes as well as the hosts' political careers.

On some occasions, the podcast releases "emergency" episodes, reacting to major news events, such as the resignations of Rishi Sunak and Sajid Javid and the dismissal of Kwasi Kwarteng.

Special guests
The podcast also hosts special guests, interviewing active and retired politicians on their careers and current events. The following public figures have been interviewed on the podcasts' special episodes:

The Rest is Politics: Leading
In January 2023, Goalhanger began a new podcast series, "The Rest is Politics: Leading", for Campbell and Stewart to interview their special guests and to invite non-political figures as guests:

References

2022 podcast debuts
Audio podcasts
Interview podcasts
Political podcasts
British podcasts